College of Science is one of the University of Tehran's colleges. It is one of the oldest postgraduate centers in Iran, which was established in 1934 under the name of College of Science. It also called Science Campus. At present, the College of Science is the largest university unit among all Iranian colleges where basic science research is conducted. The College of Science has five schools and students study at the undergraduate, graduate and doctoral levels there. The main College of Science building is located in the central campus of the University of Tehran, Tehran, Iran. The college has 2600 students and 130 faculty members.

History
The establishment of the College of Science dates back to the establishment of the Dar ul-Funun, about 150 years ago, when the level of education was at the level of high school. Courses taught at the Dar ul-Funun included physics, chemistry, natural sciences, pharmacy, and mining, to which arithmetic, geometry, geography, and painting were gradually added.

In 1928, the plan of an institution called the Higher Teachers' College (Higher Education University) including the faculties of sciences and literature was laid. The Faculty of Science included physics-chemistry, mathematics and natural sciences. The college had two Iranian professors and seven French professors, for a total of 100 students. Mahmoud Hessabi and Gholam Hossein Rahnama were the two Iranian professors in this college.

In 1934, the proposal to establish the University of Tehran, consisting of six faculties of medicine, law, natural sciences, technology, theology and teachers' colleges, was given to the then minister Ali-Asghar Hekmat by Dr. Hesabi, Dr. Sediq and Monsieur Batliani and was approved by the Islamic Consultative Assembly in the same year. After the establishment of the University of Tehran in 1934, the literary department of the Higher Teachers' College became the Faculty of Literature and the scientific department became the Faculty of Science, as part of the University of Tehran. Of course, in 1955, the Higher Teachers' College was separated from the faculties of literature and science and began another period of its activity.

From 1934 to 1958, the Faculty of Science accepted students for a three-year bachelor's degree through exams held by the Faculty (In the form of intra-group).

The building of the Faculty of Science was inaugurated in 1951 and it was decided that instead of having different departments of science in each faculty, all basic science disciplines would be located in the Faculty of Science. In 1952, the field of physics and chemistry was divided into two independent fields of physics and chemistry and the field of natural sciences into two fields of biology and geology, and in 1959 the fields of biology and geology were formed in group independently. In 1963, due to coordination between the faculty program and foreign faculties, it was decided to increase the bachelor's degree course to 4 years, and its degree, which was called a diploma, to be recognized as a bachelor's degree and thus gain value internationally. From this year, students entered the university through the national entrance exam. Postgraduate courses were also expanded and courses organized on a unit-by-unit basis. In 1975, the name of the Mathematics Department was changed to the Department of Mathematics and Computer Science, and in 2001, it was changed to the Department of Mathematics, Statistics and Computer Science.

Since 2005, along with organizational changes at the University of Tehran, Faculty of Science has been renamed to College of Science and formed its own independent schools with an independent educational structure.

Organizational structure
Organizational structure of the College of Science is as follows:

Schools
The College of Science has five schools and a department:

 College of Science
 School of Mathematics, Statistics and Computer Science
 Department of Mathematics
 Pure Mathematics
 Bachelor
 Master
 PhD
 Department of Applied Mathematics
 Applied Mathematics
 Bachelor
 Master
 PhD
 Department of Statistics
 Statistics
 Bachelor
 Master
 PhD
 Department of Computer Science
 Computer Science
 Bachelor
 Master
 PhD
 School of Physics
 Atomic and Molecular Physics Department
 Atomic and Molecular Physics
 Bachelor
 Master
 PhD
 Elementary Particle Physics Department
 Elementary Particle Physics
 Bachelor
 Master
 PhD
 Gravitation and Astrophysics Department
 Gravitation and Astrophysics
 Bachelor
 Master
 PhD
 Nuclear Physics Department
 Nuclear Physics
 Bachelor
 Master
 PhD
 Nano-Physics Department
 Nano-Physics
 Master
 PhD
 School of Chemistry
 Applied Chemistry Department
 Applied Chemistry
 Bachelor
 Master
 Pure Chemistry Department
 Bachelor
 Pure Chemistry
 Physical Chemistry Department
 Physical Chemistry
 Master
 PhD
 Nano Chemistry Department
 Nano Chemistry
 Master
 PhD
 Analytical Chemistry Department
 Analytical Chemistry
 Master
 PhD
 Polymer Chemistry Department
 Polymer Chemistry
 Master
 PhD
 Organic Chemistry Department
 Organic Chemistry
 Master
 PhD
 Inorganic Chemistry Department
 Inorganic Chemistry
 Master
 PhD
 School of Geology
 Department of Soft Rocks
 Sedimentology, Stratigraphy, and Petroleum Geology
 Master
 PhD
 Department of Hard Rocks
 Petrology and Economic Geology
 Master
 PhD
 Department of Engineering Geology and Tectonic
 Engineering Geology, Structural Geology and Tectonic
 Master
 PhD
 School of Biology
 Department of Animal Biology
 Animal Sciences
 Bachelor
 Animal Sciences - Biosystematics
 Master
 Animal Sciences - Physiology
 Master
 Animal Sciences - Developmental Biology
 Master
 Animal Biosystematics
 PhD
 Animal Physiology
 PhD
 Animal Developmental Biology
 PhD
 Department of Cell and Molecular Biology
 Cell and Molecular Biology
 Bachelor
 Master
 PhD
 -
 Biotechnology
 Bachelor
 Department of Microbiology
 Microbiology
 Bachelor
 Master
 PhD
 Microbial Biotechnology
 Master
 PhD
 Department of Plant Biology
 Plant Sciences
 Bachelor
 Plant Sciences - Systematics and Ecology
 Master
 Plant Sciences - Physiology
 Master
 Plant Systematics
 PhD
 Plant Physiology
 PhD
 Department of Biotechnology
 Biotechnology
 Biotechnology
 PhD

Library
The library complex of the Science Campus started its work in 1934. Since then, many changes have taken place in this library, most of which dates back to 1955. On this date, the current building of the Science Campus was inaugurated and the library was moved to the third floor of this building located in the Central Campus of the University of Tehran. The library's collection of information resources now includes over 100,000 copies, including printed and electronic books, journals, dissertations, and CDs. The College of Science's library has the following specifications:

 College of Science
 The Library
 Books
 Farsi Books
 27312 Copy
 Latin Books
 42230 Copy
 E-Books
 21761 Volume
 Journals
 Farsi Journals
 2920 Copy
 Latin Journals
 18123 Copy
 Audio & Visuals
 Farsi Audio & Visuals
 200 Volume
 Latin Audio & Visuals
 459 Volume
 Thesis
 Farsi Thesis
 4661 Volume
 Latin Thesis
 59 Volume
 Information Databases
 20 Volume

Central Laboratory
The Central Laboratory includes a set of important equipment for qualitative and quantitative examination of materials, which has been established with the aim of providing research services to students and faculty members of the University of Tehran and other scientific, research and industrial centers of the country. The Central Laboratory of has advanced and accurate devices, such as spectroscopic analysis, elemental analysis, thermal analysis and chromatography. The objectives of the Central Laboratory are listed below:

 Improve the use of research facilities and equipment
 Creating the necessary platform for conducting basic and applied research
 Promoting the research capacity of faculty members, graduate students and all researchers and scholars of other universities and centers
 Communication with other laboratories inside and outside the University of Tehran, scientific, research and industrial institutions and companies in order to provide mutual services
 Purchasing and equipping new devices according to the request of various academic and research fields
 Provide test results in the shortest amount of time

Scientific Journals
The Journal of Science of the University of Tehran was established in 1968 and its first issue was published in the same year. In 2009, 33 volumes and each volume including four issues of this magazine have been published. Journal of Science is a scientific-research journal and publishes scientific articles in both English and Persian in the fields of basic sciences including mathematics, statistics and computer science, geology, biology, chemistry and physics. At present, this magazine is published every year with four issues and seasonally. The Journal of Science is currently indexed on the Mathematical Reviews and Chemical Abatracts. In 2009, based on the approval of the Science Campus Council and according to higher education policies, the Journal of Science was changed to two independent specialized journals under the following titles:

1. English language magazine Geopersia: This journal is published twice a year by the School of Geology, Campus of Sciences, University of Tehran and has scientific research validity.

2. Journal of Progress in Biological Sciences: This journal is published by the School of Biology, Campus of Sciences, University of Tehran.

Museums
The College of Science has three museums:

1. Museum of Zoology:
 The Museum of Zoology or Museum of Natural History houses a precious and unique collection of invertebrates and vertebrates and was established in 1954. Using museum preservation methods such as taxidermy, stabilization in chemical solutions, etching, resin storage and skeleton building, the collection of Iranian animals began and led to the creation of the first zoological museum in Iran. The museum is located in the School of Biology of the Science Campus.

2. Herbarium:
 The most complete and reliable reference of Iranian flora. There are 167 families of vascular plants in Iran, which include 1215 genera, some of them have only one species and some of them have up to about 800 species. The total number of taxa in Iran is about 8000, which includes about 6417 species, 611 subspecies, 465 varieties, and 83 hybrids. Of these, about 1810 are endemic to Iran. The current statistics are related to the studies conducted up to 2000 in the central herbarium of the University of Tehran. The museum is located in the School of Biology of the Science Campus.

3. Microbial Collection:
 Microbial Collection section contains a diverse set of microorganisms and provides research-executive services. The museum is located in the School of Biology of the Science Campus.

See also
 Faculty of Theology and Islamic Studies of the University of Tehran
 Faculty of Letters and Humanities of the University of Tehran
 Tehran School of Political Science
 Institute of Biochemistry and Biophysics

References

External links
 Admissions: University of Tehran
 Colleges: University of Tehran
  JOURNAL OF SCIENCE (UNIVERSITY OF TEHRAN) on SID

University of Tehran

Educational institutions established in 1934
1934 establishments in Iran
University of Tehran Campuses
University of Tehran faculties